Journal of Multicultural Counseling and Development is a quarterly peer-reviewed academic journal published by Wiley-Blackwell for the American Counseling Association on behalf of the Association for Multicultural Counseling and Development. The journal was established in 1972 as the Journal of Non-White Concerns in Personnel and Guidance.

The current editor-in-chief is Carla Adkison-Johnson, PH.D (Western Michigan University). The journal covers research, theory, and program applications pertinent to multicultural and racial and ethnic minority interests in all areas of counseling and human development.

According to the Journal Citation Reports, the journal has a 2016 impact factor of 0.421, ranking it 78th out of 80 journals in the category "Psychology, Applied".

References

External links 
 

Wiley-Blackwell academic journals
English-language journals
Publications established in 1972
Applied psychology journals
Quarterly journals
Psychotherapy journals